Anton Zingarevich (Russian: Антон Зингаревич) is a Russian businessman best known for being the former owner of Reading Football Club, who play in the English Championship. Zingarevich's bid to take over the club was announced in January 2012, and he formally purchased the club on 29 May 2012. Since then, Zingarevich has had minimum interest in the running of the club, however did make the decision to sack manager Brian McDermott, and the subsequent employment of Nigel Adkins.

Early life and education
Zingarevich is the son of Boris Zingarevich, a Russian multi-billionaire. At the age of 16, Zingarevich began education at Bearwood College, near Wokingham, England, studying there for two years. Whilst studying at Bearwood, Zingarevich would watch Reading F.C. play at Elm Park.

Football

Everton

In 2004, Zingarevich was linked with a £20m takeover of Everton. However, the deal was never completed, with Boris Zingarevich issuing a statement saying neither he nor Anton would be purchasing a football club.

Reading
In January 2012, it was announced that Sir John Madejski, the chairman of Championship football club Reading F.C., was in talks with Thames Sport Investment, a company founded by Zingarevich, over a takeover of the club. The deal was completed on 29 May 2012. The takeover had a significant effect on the club's fortunes, persuading star player Jimmy Kébé to sign a new contract and Blackburn Rovers forward Jason Roberts to join the club. Reading were promoted as Champions at the end of the season, prompting Zingarevich to promise to expand the Madejski Stadium and invest in the club's academy. Following Reading's promotion, Zingarevich became heavily involved in helping manager Brian McDermott to sign his transfer targets, personally meeting with Pavel Pogrebnyak and Gylfi Sigurðsson in attempts to convince them to sign for Reading. Pogrebnyak, a Russian international, did sign for Reading, and McDermott praised Zingarevich's contribution
On 11 March 2013, Zingarevich sacked McDermott with Reading in 19th place. Zingarevich described the sacking as "the hardest decision of my life". Since then Zingarevich only made a few more appearances at the club. Now is actively seeking along with Madejski, a new owner for the club. On 2 June 2014, Reading announced that Anton Zingarevich had left the board of the club.

Botev
In 2021 Zingarevich became owner of Bulgarian club Botev Plovdiv.

Personal life
In 2008, Zingarevich met his future wife, a Belarusian Victoria's Secret model called Yekaterina Domankova, commonly called Katsia.

References

Living people
Russian football chairmen and investors
Chairmen of Reading F.C.
Russian emigrants to the United Kingdom
Alumni of Bayes Business School
Year of birth missing (living people)
Russian businesspeople in the United Kingdom